This article contains a list of notable archers from modern-day, historical, and fictional sources.

Historical
Huang Zhong
Einar Tambarskjelve
Horace A. Ford
Howard Hill
Ishi
Jack Churchill
Genghis Khan
Jumong
Lu Bu
Minamoto no Tametomo
Nasu no Yoichi
Robin Hood (Although the classical Robin is a fiction, his character is probably a conflation of several real historical figures)
Prithviraj Chauhan
Saxton Pope
Taishi Ci
Yue Fei
Zhou Tong (archer)
Jebe
Arjuna
Karna
Ekalavya

Athletes
The following sections are alphabetized by last name.

Compound bow
Mel Clarke
Melissa-Jane Daniel
Roberval "Tico" dos Santos
Peter Elzinga
Sara López
Mike Schloesser
John Stubbs (archer)
Reo Wilde
Chris White

Recurve bow
 Charlotte Burgess
 Brady Ellison
 Victor Wunderle
 Jake Kaminski
 Jacob Wukie
 Khatuna Lorig
 Aida Roman
 Lindsey Carmichael
 Miroslava Cerna
 Simon Fairweather
 Gao Fangxia
 Naomi Folkard
 Gizem Girişmen
 Fu Hongzhi
 Deepika Kumari
 Lenka Kuncova
 Park Kyung-mo
 Lee Hwa Sook
 Justyna Mospinek
 Małgorzata Olejnik
 Darrell Pace
 Limba Ram
Viktor Ruban
Park Sung-hyun
Simon Terry
Natalia Valeeva
Alison Williamson
Yan Huilian
Xiao Yanhong

Composite bow 
Lajos Kassai

Religious and mythological

Arjuna
Abhimanyu
Agilaz
Apollo
Arash
Artemis
Ashwathama
Bhishma
Cupid
Drona
Eklavya
Feng Meng
Guru Gobind Singh Ji
Hayk
Heracles
Houyi
Indrajit
Karna
Laxman
Odysseus
Parashurama
Rama
Rudra
Skaði
Teucer
Ullr

Fictional

 Notable archers
 
 
Notable archers